Hakea brachyptera, commonly known as the short-winged hakea, is a shrub in the family Proteaceae native to an area in the southern Wheatbelt and Great Southern regions of Western Australia.

Description
Leaves are densely covered with finely matted hairs ending with a very sharp erect point. Clusters of flowers appear in racemes of 1-5 individual flowers in the leaf axils. Hakea brachyptera is a frost-tolerant species.

Taxonomy and naming
Hakea brachyptera was first formally described by Carl Meisner in 1856 and published in de Candolle's Prodromus Systematis Naturalis Regni Vegetabilis. The specific epithet (brachyptera) is derived from the Ancient Greek words brachys meaning "short" and pteron meaning "wing" or "fin" referring to the seed structure.

Distribution and habitat
Hakea brachyptera is found in southwest Western Australian, from near Wagin to Lake Magenta and south near the Stirling Range. Hakea brachyptera requires a well-drained site with a sunny aspect and sandy loam, clay or gravel.

Conservation status
Hakea brachyptera is classified as "Priority Three" by the Government of Western Australia Department of Parks and Wildlife, meaning that it is rare or near threatened, due to its restricted distribution.

References

brachyptera
Eudicots of Western Australia
Plants described in 1856
Taxa named by Carl Meissner